Transactive may refer to:
 Transactive communication
 Transactive energy
 Transactive memory

See also
 Transaction (disambiguation)